Marin Sorescu (29 February 1936 – 8 December 1996) was a Romanian poet, playwright, and novelist.

His works were translated into more than 20 countries, and the total number of his books that were published abroad rises up to 60 books. He has also been known for his painting, and he opened many art exhibits in Romania and abroad. He occupied the position of Minister of Culture within the Nicolae Văcăroiu Cabinet, without being a member of any political party, after the Romanian revolution of 1989 (from 25 November 1993 to 5 May 1995).

Biography 
Born to a family of farmworkers in Bulzești, Dolj County, Sorescu graduated from the primary school in his home village. After that he went to the Buzesti Brothers High School in Craiova, after which he was transferred to the Predeal Military School. His final education was at the University of Iaşi, where, in 1960, he graduated with a degree in modern languages. His first book, a collection of parodies in 1964 entitled Singur printre poeţi ("Alone Among Poets"), was widely discussed. He himself called them "sarcastic and awkward". Ten volumes of poetry and prose followed, having a very rapid ascension in the world of literary, as a poet, novelist, playwright, essayist. He grew so popular that his readings were held in football stadiums. In 1971, he was a resident of the International Writing Program at the University of Iowa.

On his poetry, Sorescu said, with characteristic irony: "Just as I can't give up smoking because I don't smoke, I can't give up writing because I have no talent." He often claimed a sense of alienation, saying "the spoken word is a crossed frontier. By the act of saying something, I fail to say many other things." On censorship, he said, after his last, post-1989 Revolution volumes were delayed, "we have won our freedom, so I mustn't complain. O censors, where are you now?"

Sorescu's collection of Censored Poems comprised poems which could not be published until after the Nicolae Ceauşescu Communist dictatorship; of these, the best known is House under surveillance.

Iona, the play written by Marin Sorescu and first published in 1968 is a true masterpiece. The biblical myth says the prophet Iona (Jonah) was swallowed by a whale. In his play, Sorescu takes the story further and imagines what happens to Iona while he was inside the whale. "The most terrible part of the play is when Iona loses his echo", writes  Sorescu in the foreword of this play. "Iona was alone, but his echo was whole. He shouted: Io-na, and his echo answered: Io-na. Then, it remained just half of the echo. He shouted Io-na, but all he could hear was Io. Io, in some ancient language, means me". Iona was played to a full house in Bucharest in 1969, but the tragedy was quickly withdrawn, because its content was considered too controversial.

Ill with cirrhosis and hepatitis, he died from a heart attack at the Elias Hospital in Bucharest, aged 60.

Collections of Sorescu in English translation 
 Marin Sorescu- Selected Poems (from 6 collections, 1965-73), translated Michael Hamburger (Bloodaxe, 1983) 
 The Biggest Egg in the World, translated by Ted Hughes, Seamus Heaney &c., ed. Edna Longley (Bloodaxe, 1987)
 Hands Behind My Back: Selected Poems, trans. Gabriela Dragnea, Adriana Varga, & Stuart Friebert (Oberlin College Press, 1991). 
 Censored Poems, translated John Hartley Williams & Hilde Ottschofski (Bloodaxe, 2001)
 The Bridge (Poems written by Sorescu on his death bed), translated Adam J Sorkin & Lidia Vianu (Bloodaxe, 2004)

Sorescu in English language anthologies 
 An Anthology of Contemporary Romanian Poetry (contains 22 poems by Sorescu), translated by Andrea Deletant and Brenda Walker (Forest Books, 1984) 
 The Faber Book of Modern European Poetry, ed. A. Alvarez (Faber and Faber, 1992) 
 The Vintage Book of Contemporary World Poetry (pg. 219), edited by J.D. McClatchy (Vintage, 1996) 
 Bloodaxe Poetry Introductions: Enzensberger, Holub, Sorescu (contains 21 poems by Sorescu), ed. Neil Astley (Bloodaxe, 2006)
 Born in Utopia – An anthology of Modern and Contemporary Romanian Poetry - Carmen Firan and Paul Doru Mugur (editors) with Edward Foster – Talisman House Publishers – 2006 – 
 Testament – Anthology of Modern Romanian Verse - American Edition – Daniel Ioniță (editor and translator) with Eva Foster, Rochelle Bews, and Daniel Reynaud – monolingual English language edition – Australian-Romanian Academy Publishing – 2017 – 
 2019 -Testament - 400 Years of Romanian Poetry/400 de ani de poezie românească - Minerva Publishing 2019 - Daniel Ioniță (editor and principal translator) assisted by Daniel Reynaud, Adriana Paul and Eva Foster. 
 2020 - Romanian Poetry from its Origins to the Present - bilingual edition - Daniel Ioniță (editor and principal translator) with Daniel Reynaud, Adriana Paul and Eva Foster - Australian-Romanian Academy Publishing - 2020 -  ;

Awards
 Romanian Academy prize, 1968, 1977
 The Gold Medal for Poetry "Napoli ospite", Italy, 1970
 The Prize of the Romanian Academy for Drama, 1970
 "Le Muse", granted by Accademie delle Muse, Florence, 1978
 The International Poetry Prize "Fernado Riello", Madrid, Spain, 1983
 The International Herder Prize, granted by the University of Vienna in 1991 for his entire activity
 Romanian Writers' Union prize (6 times, for poetry, drama, and literary criticism)
He was also nominated to the Nobel Prize in Literature.

Affiliations
 1971 – Fellow, International Writing Program, University of Iowa
 1983 – Member of Mallarmé Academy, Paris
 1992 – Member of the Romanian Academy
 1955 –  Alumnus of Frații Buzești High School

See also

 Romanian Academy
 Frații Buzești High School 
 List of Romanian playwrights

Notes 

1936 births
1996 deaths
Censorship in Romania
People from Dolj County
Titular members of the Romanian Academy
Romanian male poets
Romanian male novelists
Romanian dramatists and playwrights
Romanian Ministers of Culture
Alexandru Ioan Cuza University alumni
20th-century Romanian novelists
20th-century Romanian poets
20th-century Romanian dramatists and playwrights
Male dramatists and playwrights
International Writing Program alumni
Herder Prize recipients
20th-century Romanian male writers